Lee Erwin may refer to:

 Lee Erwin (writer) (1906–1972), television writer
 Lee Erwin (organist) (1908–2000), American theatre and radio organist
 Lee Erwin (footballer) (born 1994), Scottish footballer